"Amor a la Mexicana" (Love, Mexican-Style) is a song by Mexican artist Thalía written by Mario Puparro and produced by Emilio Estefan Jr. It was the first single from her fifth studio album of the same title. It is recognized as one of Thalía's signature songs and it's one of the biggest classics of Mexican pop music. Cuca's Fiesta Mix was released in Europe as a single. The single was certified Gold in France for more 250,000 Copies.

Music video

There are three different music videos for the song.

The first one, for the original version, was released in July, 1997. It was directed by Benny Corral and mostly shot in a Mexican casa where Thalia walks around, sleeps in various places (a hammock, a large bed and a chair) and interacts with various typically Mexican props (such as a sombrero and several cacti).

The second version was released for the European remix version of the song in 1998. It features Thalia as the sales clerk at a truck stop in the desert and a lot of dance.

In 2001 Thalia re-released the song (with a new mix) as a single for the album “Con Banda”. A third music video was made and features several traditional and iconic elements from the mexican culture.

Track listings

CD Promo
 Amor A La Mexicana (Album Version) – 4:23

Official Versions and Remixes
 Amor a La Mexicana (Album Version) – 4:23
 Amor a La Mexicana (Banda Version) – 3:55
 Amor a La Mexicana (Emilio Mix) – 4:00
 Amor a La Mexicana (Tequila radio edit) – 4:42
 Amor a La Mexicana (Cuca's fiesta edit) – 3:50
 Amor a La Mexicana (Fiesta latina edit) – 4:02
 Amor a La Mexicana (Tequila club mix) – 5:18
 Amor a La Mexicana (Cuca's fiesta mix) – 6:56
 Amor a La Mexicana (Fiesta latina club) – 7:00

Promo CD + Interview
 Amor a La Mexicana (Album Version) – 4:23
 Entrevista
 Presentando Sus Temas

Charts

Weekly charts

Year-end charts

Certifications and sales

References

External links
 Amor A La Mexicana (Original Version) YouTube Video
 Amor A La Mexicana (European Remix) YouTube Video
 Amor A La Mexicana (Emilio Banda Remix) YouTube Video

Thalía songs
1997 singles
Spanish-language songs
Song recordings produced by Emilio Estefan
EMI Latin singles
1997 songs